"Gimme Back" is a single by musician Michael Oldfield.  It is from the album Heaven's Open.  It was only released in Germany in 1991. Oldfield performs vocals himself.

Track listing 
 "Gimme Back" – 4:12
 "Amarok" (excerpt II) – 3:22
 "Amarok" (excerpt III) – 9:30

References 

 

1991 singles
Mike Oldfield songs
Song recordings produced by Tom Newman (musician)
Songs written by Mike Oldfield
Virgin Records singles
1990 songs